The Kings of Connacht were rulers of the cóiced (variously translated as portion, fifth, province) of Connacht, which lies west of the River Shannon, Ireland. However, the name only became applied to it in the early medieval era, being named after the Connachta.

The old name for the province was Cóiced Ol nEchmacht (the fifth of the Ol nEchmacht). Ptolemy's map of c. 150 AD does in fact list a people called the Nagnatae as living in the west of Ireland. Some are of the opinion that Ptolemy's Map of Ireland may be based on cartography carried out as much as five hundred years before his time.

The Connachta were a group of dynasties who claimed descent from the three eldest sons of Eochaid Mugmedon: Brion, Ailill and Fiachrae. They took their collective name from their alleged descent from Conn Cétchathach. Their younger brother, Niall Noigiallach was ancestor to the Uí Néill.

The following is a list of kings of Connacht from the fifth to fifteenth centuries.

Pre-historic Kings of Ol nEchmacht
 Genann
 Conrac Cas
 Eochaid Feidlech
 Eochaidh Allat
 Tinni mac Conri
 Medb, Queen of Connacht
 Medb and Ailill mac Máta
 Maine Aithreamhail mac Ailill Máta
 Sanbh Sithcheann mac Ceat mac Magha
 Cairbre mac Maine Aithreamhail
 Eochaidh Fionn
 Aodh mac Cu Odhar
 Eochaidh mac Cairbre
 Aonghus Fionn mac Domhnall
 Cormac Ulfhada
 Aonghus Feirt mac Aonghus Fionn
 Connall Cruchain mac Aonghus Feirt
 Fearadach mac Connal Cruchain
 Forghus Fiansa
 Forghus Fiansa and Art mac Conn
 Ceidghin Cruchain mac Connall Cruchain
 Aodh mac Eochaidh
 Aodh Alainn mac Eochaidh Baicidh
 Nia Mór mac Lughna
 Lughaidh mac Lughna Fear Tri
 Aodh Caomh mac Garadh Glundubh
 Coinne mac Fear Tri
 Muireadh Tireach mac Fiachra Sraibrintne
 Eochaid Mugmedon
 Niall Noigiallach/Niall of the Nine Hostages, died c. 450/455

List of historical kings

Uí Fiachrach, 406–482

Uí Briúin, 482–500

Uí Fiachrach, 500–549

Uí Briúin, 549–600

Uí Fiachrach Aidhne, 600–622

Uí Briúin, 622–649

Uí Fiachrach Aidhne, 649–663

Uí Briúin Seóla, 663–682

Uí Fiachrach Muaidhe, 682–683

Uí Fiachrach Aidhne, 683–696

Uí Briúin Síl Muiredaig, 696–702

Uí Briúin Síl Cellaig, 702–705

Uí Fiachrach Muaidhe, 705–707

Uí Briúin Síl Muiredaig, 707–723

Uí Briúin Síl Cellaig, 723–728

Uí Briúin Síl Cathail, 728–735

Uí Briúin Síl Muiredaig, 735–742

Uí Briúin Síl Cellaig, 742–756

Uí Fiachrach Muaidhe, 756–764

Uí Briúin Síl Cathail, 764–768

Uí Fiachrach Muaidhe, 768–773

Uí Briúin Síl Cellaig, 773–777

Uí Briúin Síl Cathail, 777–782

Uí Briúin Síl Muiredaig, 782–786

Uí Briúin Síl Cathail, 786–792

Uí Briúin Síl Cellaig, 792–796

Uí Briúin Síl Muiredaig, 796–839

Uí Briúin Síl Cathail, 839–843

Uí Briúin Síl Muiredaig, 843–848

Uí Briúin Síl Cathail, 848–872

Uí Briúin Síl Muiredaig, 872–956

Ó Ruairc, 956–967

Ó Conchobhair, 967–1030

Ó Ruairc, 1030–1046

Ó Conchobhair, 1046–1067

Ó Ruairc, 1067–1087

Ó Conchobhair, 1087–1092

Ó Flaithbheartaigh, 1092–1095

Ó Conchobhair, 1092–1097

Ó Ruairc, 1097–1102

Ó Conchobhair, 1102–1280

Muircheartaigh Uí Conchobhair, 1280–1293

Ó Conchobhair, 1293–1309

Muircheartaigh Uí Conchobhair, 1309–1310

Ó Conchubhair Ruadh, 1310–1317

Ó Conchobhair, 1316–1317

Ó Conchubhair Donn, 1317–1350

Ó Conchobhair Sligigh, 1318–1324

Muircheartaigh Uí Conchobhair, 1342–1350

Ó Conchubhair Donn, 1368–1474

See also
 List of High Kings of Ireland
 List of kings of Ulster
 List of kings of Leinster
 List of kings of Munster
 List of kings of Mide

Sources

Annals of the Four Masters, 1990 edition.
The Annals of Connacht, A. Martin Freeman, 1944.
Irish Kings and High Kings, Francis John Byrne, 1973.
Leabhar Mor Genealach, Dubhaltach MacFhirbhisigh, ed. O'Muralie, 2004.

External links
Ó Conchobair and Burke at The Irish Story
A Poem on the Kings of Connacht

 
Connachta
Ui Fiachrach
Lists of Irish monarchs
O'Conor dynasty